Glen Robinson may refer to:

 Glen Robinson (cricketer) (born 1971), Guyanese cricketer
 Glen Robinson (visual effects) (1914–2002), American special effects artist
 Glen Robinson (water polo) (born 1989), British water polo player.
 Glen P. Robinson (1923–2013), American technologist

See also
 Glenn Robinson (disambiguation)